? (German for "Question mark") is the second album by German pop rock band Nena and the third studio album to feature its lead singer, Gabriele "Nena" Kerner. It was released on 27 January 1984, just a few months before the band's first international album , which contains songs from their debut album Nena (1983) and this album, some of them re-recorded with English lyrics.

Like its self-titled predecessor, this album was produced by Reinhold Heil and Manne Praeker of Spliff.

Title track

The album's title track was co-written by Nena and the band's keyboard player Jörn-Uwe Fahrenkrog-Petersen and is so called since, having written the song, Nena was unable to settle on a title and so indicated its spot in the band's live set list with a question mark.  It reached  in the German charts in 1983.  The lyrics written by Nena comprise the thoughts of someone racked by indecisiveness ("Today I'm coming, today I'm also going... Perhaps I'll stay, yesterday that wasn't for me, today I need endless love") but still adamant that they know what's best for them ("No-one can tell me what is best... and who is best... because I know exactly").  The song is a mainstay of Nena's live concerts and seems to be particularly popular with female fans although it is not uncommon for Nena to interrupt her performance of the song, apparently to laugh at the absurdity of the lyrics.  In the middle of the version recorded for the 2004 album Nena Live Nena she says, "I felt so small when I wrote this".

Like most of the band's greatest hits,  was anglicised for the international album  and then updated for the Nena feat. Nena album, which reignited Nena's solo career in 2002.

Track listing
Side A contains tracks 1 to 6 and Side B contains tracks 7 to 12.

Personnel
Credits adapted from Allmusic and Discogs.

Nena
Nena Kerner – main vocals, arrangement
Jörn-Uwe Fahrenkrog-Petersen – keyboard, backing vocals, lead vocals on track 3
Carlo Karges – guitar, backing vocals
Jürgen Dehmel – bass
Rolf Brendel – drums, percussion

"? (Fragezeichen)" and "Lass mich dein Pirat sein"
David Sanborn – saxophone
Ollie Cotton – engineering
Stanley Wallace – engineering

Technical personnel
Imre Sereg – engineering (on all tracks, except "? (Fragezeichen)" and "Lass mich dein Pirat sein")
Manfred "Manne" Praeker – production
Reinhold Heil – engineer (on all tracks, except "? (Fragezeichen)" and "Lass mich dein Pirat sein"), production
Jim Rakete – cover design
Roman Stolz – cover design
Rico Sonderegger – mastering

Charts

Certifications and sales

Release history

References

External links
? (Fragezeichen) at the official Nena website

1984 albums
Nena (band) albums
CBS Records albums
German-language albums
Albums produced by Reinhold Heil